John Aloysius Canavan (August 3, 1896 – October 2, 1963) was an American attorney who served as the United States Attorney for the District of Massachusetts from 1938 to 1939.

References

United States Attorneys for the District of Massachusetts
1896 births
1963 deaths